Jennifer Speake, née Drake-Brockman (born 1944, Toronto) is a Canadian-British freelance writer and editor of reference books.

Life
Jennifer Anne Speake was born in Toronto in 1944. She was the daughter of Lieutenant-Colonel Guy Percy Lumsden Drake-Brockman and Vera Mary McLeod Harrison Topham, later of Hilton, KwaZulu-Natal in South Africa.  She has an MA and BPhil.

Career 
Working at Oxford University Press, Speake helped OED editor John Simpson bring out a second edition of his Concise Oxford Dictionary of Proverbs, and a third edition in 1998. She became sole editor for the fourth (2003) and subsequent editions. Speake's other work included a biography of Thomas Vaughan, a philosopher from Wales.

Speake's three-volume 2003 encyclopedia of travel literature received a 2004 Reference and User Services Association award. One reviewer called it "an amazing collection of those people, famous, not-so-famous, and infamous alike, who have traveled the world over, with long lists of additional books for the travel narrative lover". Another reviewer, while noting inconsistency in its coverage, praised it as providing "an unusually rich entrée into an immense field that crosses cultural, historical and discipinary boundaries."

Selected publications

Personal life 
In the 1970s she married Graham Speake, an English classicist and academic publisher.

References

1944 births
Living people
Oxford University Press people
Canadian book editors
Canadian emigrants to the United Kingdom
People from KwaZulu-Natal
20th-century Canadian women writers
Canadian women editors